Data driven marketing is a process used by marketers to gain insights and identify trends about consumers and how they behave — what they buy, the effectiveness of ads, and how they browse. Modern solutions rely on big data strategies and collect information about consumer interactions and engagements to generate predictions about future behaviors. This kind of analysis involves understanding data already present, data that can be acquired, and how to organize, analyze, and apply that data to better marketing efforts. The intended goal is generally to enhance and personalize the customer experience. The market research allows for a comprehensive study of preferences.

History of data driven marketing 
Some marketing decisions have always been made on the basis of data, defined in the general sense as information. Audience targeting and segmentation strategies provide many examples. Since 1950, the Nielsen ratings have provided information to media buyers about television program audiences. Business-to-business marketers often target advertising to specialized trade publications and their digital channels.

Data driven marketing in the contemporary sense can be traced back to the 1980s and the emergence of database marketing, which increased the ease of personalizing customer communications. In 1993, WebTrends released one of the first web analytics products when only a few hundred websites existed. In the twenty-first century, social media and mobile technology have contributed to an explosion in the amount of data and its availability. Today, marketers use tools such as:

 Google Analytics
 Customer relationship management (CRM) and marketing automation platforms
 Social media analytics
 Pay-per-click (PPC) and search engine marketing (SEM) analytics
 Heat maps or web optimization tools (A/B testing data).

Types of data driven marketing 
The universe of data driven marketing is vast, but there are essentially two types of data used in marketing: contact information and performance metrics. Capturing contact information allows marketers to track potential customers and target them through emails, paid social, other digital tactics, and even potentially phone calls or direct mail, such as catalogs. Tracking of performance metrics, such as engagement, clicks, and page views enables marketers to improve and refine marketing activities to more effectively reach high-value prospects.

Phases 
 Data collection - This phase ensures customer/consumer data is collected from various source systems to create a 'Complete Customer Profile' 
 Data activation - This phase focuses on 'personalized marketing'. Based on the data collected, marketing strategy can be planned and focused. Activation can be across multiple channels (email marketing, SMS marketing, social marketing, digital ads etc.). Marketers can target their audience with relevant messaging that can be personalized - i.e., different communication based on phase of customer life cycle. 
 Analytics and Insights - Marketers can collect information on their consumers/customers and define several models to learn more. Based on the engagement the customer/consumer has with the brand, the models can help refine the target audience and predictions, thus ensuring focused effort of marketers to acquire new customers or retain existing customers.
Analytic tools allow for targeted and personalized marketing to the customer. Companies use customer reviews and customer support conversations to extract data for planning the marketing strategy. Approaching an audience with a targeted campaign increases the chances of their conversion. Marketers can now understand customer behavior and make informed decisions based on the data, thus allowing for relevant targeting.

Data analysis techniques 
Analysis techniques for marketing can include:

 Web analytics: Measurement of page views, traffic by device and other activity.
 Metrics for “lead magnets” or content offers: Simple measurements such as call-to-action (CTA) click-through rates and more complex data such as the ratio of generated leads to marketing-qualified leads (MQL).
 Email marketing metrics: Including open rate and unsubscribe rate.
 Content and social media metrics: Engagement rate, follows, shares and other measurements.
 E-commerce metrics: Shopping cart abandonment rate and other activity.

Advanced marketing analytics uses complex models to provide intelligence such as:

 Customer lifetime value
 Marketing attribution: evaluate the effectiveness of the campaign, attribute success or failure to channels and presentation
 Clustering: group customers based on personal characteristics
 Conversion prediction: list users who are likely to turn into customers
 Anomaly detection
 Forecasting

Examples of data driven marketing 
E-commerce retailers use data driven marketing extensively to ensure the best customer experience and increase sales. One example cited in the Harvard Business Review is Vineyard Vines, a fashion brand with brick-and-mortar stores and an online product catalog. The company has used an artificial intelligence (AI) platform to gain insights about its customers from actions taken or not taken on the e-commerce site. Email or social media communications are automatically triggered at certain points, such as cart abandonment. Insights are also used to refine search engine marketing.

In business-to-business marketing, where inbound leads must be captured and nurtured, tactics are more likely to be aimed at long-term retention of the prospect rather than urging them to buy. Content marketing is frequently used. Prospects may be offered a white paper or other high-value information resources in exchange for their email address. Marketing automation tools support continuing activity along the customer journey.

References 

Marketing techniques